The Vârtej is a left tributary of the river Cotmeana in Romania. It flows into the Cotmeana near Poiana Lacului.

References

Rivers of Romania
Rivers of Argeș County